IOB may stand for:

 Indian Overseas Bank, a public sector bank in India
 Input/Output Block, see Execute Channel Program
 Inside Outside Beginning, a file representation format for tagging tokens
 Institute of Development Policy and Management, Instituut voor Ontwikkelingsbeleid en -beheer (University of Antwerp, Belgium)
 Intelligence Oversight Board, of the U.S. President's Foreign Intelligence Advisory Board
 Iranian oil bourse, a commodity exchange